Fluperolone acetate is a corticosteroid. It has been used topically.

References 

Corticosteroid esters
Corticosteroids
Organofluorides
Acetate esters